The list of operational stations of Namma Metro, also known as Bangalore Metro (rapid transit system serving the city of Bangalore in India) is as per table below. Out of the operational 52 metro stations of Namma Metro as of November 2022, there are 43 elevated stations, 8 underground stations and 1 at-grade station.

The first section (on Purple Line) of the Namma Metro system opened on 20 October 2011 between Baiyappanahalli and M.G Road. The system is operated by the Bangalore Metro Rail Corporation Limited (BMRCL).

Each line of Namma Metro is identified by a specific colour. The system uses rolling stock of standard gauge and has a combination of elevated, underground and at-grade lines. The Metro is operational from about 05:00 to 23:00 hours with trains operating at a frequency of 5 to 15 minutes. The Purple Line connects Kengeri in the west and Baiyappanahalli in the east, while the Green Line connects Nagasandra in the north and Silk Institute in the south. The network is currently being expanded with the addition of new lines and extensions to existing lines (see below for Complete List of Stations).

Operational Stations

Statistics

Complete List of Stations 
The list below includes operational and under-construction stations.

See also
List of Chennai Metro stations
List of Delhi Metro stations
List of Hyderabad Metro stations
List of Jaipur Metro stations
List of Kochi Metro stations
List of Kolkata Metro stations

References

External links
BMRC Homepage

Lists of metro stations in India
Bangalore-related lists

Lists of buildings and structures in Karnataka